The 2015 Team Ice Racing World Championship was the 37th edition of the Team World Championship. The final was held on 28 February and 01 March, 2015, in Berlin, Germany. Russia won their 13th consecutive title and 21st title overall.

Final Classification

See also 
 2015 Individual Ice Racing World Championship
 2015 Speedway World Cup in classic speedway
 2015 Speedway Grand Prix in classic speedway

References 

Ice speedway competitions
World